Bird 'n' Roll is the seventh studio album by the French rock band Dionysos, released 26 March 2012.  The album features songs in both French and English.

There are several links between this album and lead singer Mathias Malzieu's Métamorphose en bord de ciel, similar to other relationships between the band's discography and Mathias Malzieu's novels, such as La Mécanique du cœur. The first single Cloudman came out on 23 January 2012, following teasers that hinted that the music video would depict the transformation of Tom Cloudman as in the novel Métamorphose en bord de ciel.

For this album Babet participated actively in the band, after having taken only a minor role in their last album five years earlier, "La Mécanique du Cœur".

Some new instruments feature in this album, following the band's acoustic tour in 2009.  The album itself has been described as "rock for birds", which supports its link to the novel, Métamorphose en bord de ciel. However, unlike La Mécanique du Cœur, only five tracks of the twelve link directly to the novel, taking the band back to the formula of the preceding album, Monsters in Love.

Musicians and instruments

Band 
 Mathias Malzieu: vocals, ukulele, folk guitar, harmonica
 Michaël Ponton: guitar, percussion, chorus
 Éric Serra-Tosio: drums, percussion, whistle, chorus
 Stéphan Bertholio: keys, banjo, musical saw, glockenspiel, lapsteel, guitar, chorus, music box, melodica
 Guillaume Garidel: bass, double bass, musical glasses, Moog synthesizer, chorus, mellotron
 Élisabeth Maistre: vocals, violon, stylophone, chorus, bells

Additional Musicians 
 Olivier Daviaud: piano, whistle, chorus
 Lise Chemla: chorus, vocals
 Guillemette Foucard: chorus, vocals
 Johanna Hilaire: chorus, vocals

Track listing

References 

2012 albums
Dionysos (French band) albums
Barclay (record label) albums